The Catholic–Muslim Forum is a forum for dialogue between Catholics and Muslims. The first summit took place on 4–6 November 2008 in the Vatican with nearly fifty delegates. The chosen theme was "Love of God, Love of Neighbour."

See also 
A Common Word Between Us and You

External links
Vatican Launches Catholic-Islamic Dialogue
Catholic-Muslim Forum to Further Dialogue
Pope approves permanent Catholic-Muslim forum
Pope Addresses Catholic - Muslim Forum in Rome
Catholic-Muslim Forum ends on upbeat note
Final Statement of Catholic-Muslim Forum

Catholicism and Islam
Interfaith organizations
2008 in Islam
21st-century Islam
21st-century Catholicism
2008 in Christianity